Hajiabad is a town in Kotli District, Azad Kashmir, Pakistan. It is located on the Holar-Kotli road, and is a midway point for the travellers coming from Rawalpindi and Islamabad.

References

Populated places in Kotli District